Bring On the Night is the first live album by Sting recorded over the course of several live shows in 1985 and released in 1986. The title is taken from a song by the Police from their 1979 album Reggatta de Blanc. The songs performed include Sting's early solo material from the studio album The Dream of the Blue Turtles, and from his time with The Police, with a few of the performances played as medleys of the two. The touring band features the prominent jazz musicians Branford Marsalis on saxophone and clarinet, Darryl Jones on bass guitar, Kenny Kirkland on keyboards and synthesizer, and  Omar Hakim on drums. Also appearing are backing vocalists Janice Pendarvis and Dolette McDonald.

Despite not featuring any hit singles, the album reached number 16 on the UK Album Charts and won Sting a Grammy Award in 1988 for Best Pop Vocal Performance, Male.

Bring On the Night is also a 1985 documentary directed by Michael Apted covering the formative stages of Sting's solo career—released as DVD in 2005.

Track listing
All songs written by Sting, except where noted.

Side one
"Bring On the Night/When the World Is Running Down, You Make the Best of What's Still Around" – (Recorded in Paris 23 December 1985) – 11:41
"Consider Me Gone"– (Recorded in Paris 29 May 1985) - 4:53
"Low Life" – (Recorded in Paris 23 December 1985) -  4:03
Side two
"We Work the Black Seam" – (Recorded in Paris 23 December 1985) -  6:55
"Driven to Tears" – (Recorded in Paris 23 December 1985) - 6:59
"Dream of the Blue Turtles/Demolition Man" – (Recorded in Paris 23 December 1985) - 6:08
Side three
"One World (Not Three)/Love Is the Seventh Wave" – (Recorded in Paris 23 December 1985) - 11:10
"Moon over Bourbon Street" – (Recorded in Arnhem 21 December 1985) - 4:19
"I Burn for You" – (Recorded in Paris 23 December 1985) - 5:38
Side four
"Another Day" – (Recorded in Rome 4 December 1985) -  4:41
"Children's Crusade" – (Recorded in Arnhem 21 December 1985) - 5:22
"Down So Long" (Alex Atkins, J. B. Lenoir) – (Recorded in Paris 29 May 1985) -   4:54
"Tea in the Sahara" – (Recorded in Arnhem 21 December 1985) - 6:25

On CD and digital editions, sides 1 and 2 correspond to disc 1 and sides 3 and 4 to disc 2.

Personnel

 Sting – lead vocals, keyboards, guitars, double bass on "I Burn for You"
 Darryl Jones – bass guitar
 Kenny Kirkland – keyboards
 Branford Marsalis – saxophones, clarinet, rap, percussion
 Janice Pendarvis – backing vocals
 Dolette McDonald – backing vocals
 Omar Hakim – drums, electronic percussion, backing vocals

Technical staff
 Producers – Kim Turner and Sting 
 Engineers – Gerd Rautenbach, Jim Scott, Kim Turner and Peter Brandt.
 Recording – Dierks Mobile 2 
 Guitar Technician – Danny Quatrochi
 Bass and Keyboard Technician – Tam Fairgreave
 Drum Technician – Billy Thompson 
 Management – Kim Turner and Miles Copeland
 Tour Management – Billy Francis 
 Production Manager – Keith Bradley
 Art Direction – Michael Ross
 Design – John Warwicker and Michael Ross 
 Painting – Su Huntley and Donna Muir
 Photography – Denis O'Regan, Donna Muir, Michael Ross and Su Huntley.
 Monitor Mixer – Tom Herrman
 Sound – Tony Blanc, John Roden and Martin Rowe.
 Lighting – Jim Laroche and Bill Neil
 Rigger – Deryck Dickinson
 Booking – Ian Copeland, Teresa Green and Buck Williams at Frontier Booking International.

Charts

Weekly charts

Year-end charts

References

Sting (musician) live albums
Grammy Award for Best Male Pop Vocal Performance
1986 live albums
A&M Records live albums